Huntsville Bible College is a non-denominational Christian seminary in Huntsville, Alabama.  Founded in 1986, the college offers both associate degrees and bachelor's degrees in Christian Education, Mission and Evangelism, and Pastoral Ministry, as well as a bachelor's in Theology.  With 72 students and 13 faculty members, it is one of the smallest post-secondary institutes in Alabama.

References

External links
Official website

Nondenominational Christian universities and colleges
Private universities and colleges in Alabama
Universities and colleges in Huntsville, Alabama
Educational institutions established in 1986
Buildings and structures in Huntsville, Alabama
1986 establishments in Alabama